This is a list of members of the House of Commons of the United Kingdom, the House of Lords, British members of the European Parliament, members of the British devolved legislatures (such as the Scottish Parliament, Senedd, and Northern Ireland Assembly) and Police and Crime Commissioners (PCCs) who have changed their party affiliation (i.e. abandoning a previous party membership to take up a new one) or who have resigned from, been suspended from or been expelled from their previous party affiliation, making them independents. When a member of a legislature switches from one party to another, this is called crossing the floor. The list details the dates, members involved, previous and new party affiliations, and an explanation for their switch.

Members of Parliament who have changed party affiliation

Members of Parliament who were suspended from their parliamentary party
These MPs were suspended by their Parliamentary Parties but continued to receive the Whip.

Members of the House of Lords who have changed party affiliation 
The House of Lords is not an elective body.

Members of the European Parliament who have changed party affiliation

London Assembly Members who have changed party affiliation

Members of the Welsh Parliament who have changed party affiliation 
{|class="wikitable"
|- style="background:#ccc;"
!Date
!Member
!colspan=2|Before
!colspan=2|After
!Notes
|-
|colspan=7|

1999–2003 Assembly
|-
|2000
|Rod Richards
|
|
|Whip withdrawn after abstaining on a budget vote
|-
|colspan=7|

2003–2007 Assembly
|-
|2005
|Peter Law
|
|
|Left party in protest at the use of all-woman shortlists
|-
|colspan=7|

2007–2011 Assembly
|-
|2009
|Mohammad Asghar
|
|
|Explained that he was a "Unionist" and against Welsh independence
|-
|2010
|Mick Bates
|
|
|Suspended after it was discovered that he would be prosecuted for assault
|-
|colspan=7|

2016–2021 Assembly/Parliament
|-
| rowspan="2" |2016
|Nathan Gill
|
|
| Left UKIP group to sit as an independent
|-
|Dafydd Elis-Thomas
|
|
| Left Plaid Cymru party to support the Labour minority government.
|-
| rowspan="3" |2017
|Neil McEvoy
|
|
| Suspended from party group
|-
|Mark Reckless
|
|
| Left UKIP group to sit as an independent within the Conservative Group
|-
|Carl Sargeant
|
|
|Sargeant was suspended from Welsh Labour following allegations about his personal conduct.
|-
| rowspan="3" |2018
|Mandy Jones
|
|
| Left UKIP group to sit as an independent after criticising Neil Hamilton
|-
|Caroline Jones
|
|
| Left UKIP group to sit as an independent, stating the party had moved "to a more far-right position"
|-
|Jenny Rathbone
|
|
|Suspended over remarks about Jewish people.
|-
| rowspan="8" |2019
|Jenny Rathbone
|
|
|Re-admitted
|-
|Michelle Brown
|
|
| Left UKIP group to sit as an independent
|-
|Mark Reckless
|
|
| Left Conservative Group on 'good terms' to sit as an independent
|-
|Caroline Jones
|
|
| Joined the Brexit Party
|-
|Mandy Jones
|
|
| Joined the Brexit Party
|-
|Mark Reckless
|
|
| Joined the Brexit Party
|-
|David Rowlands
|
|
| Joined the Brexit Party
|-
|Gareth Bennett
|
|
| Quit the Party
|-
| rowspan="9" |2020
|Nick Ramsay
|
|
|Arrested on 1 January 2020 and suspended from the Conservative group the following day.
|-
|Neil McEvoy
|
|
| Formed the Welsh National Party
|-
|Gareth Bennett
|
|
| Joined the Abolish the Welsh Assembly Party
|-
|Nick Ramsay
|
|
|Re-admitted
|-
|Caroline Jones
|
|
| Left the Brexit Party due to their anti-devolution stance
|-
|Caroline Jones
|
|
| rowspan="3" | Formed a new group: Independent Alliance for Reform
|-
|Mandy Jones
|
|
|-
|David Rowlands
|
|
|-
|Mark Reckless
|
|
| Joined the Abolish the Welsh Assembly Party
|-
| rowspan="3" |2021
| rowspan="2" |Alun Davies
|
|
|Suspended after allegedly being involved in alcohol drinking on the Senedd estate, that could have broken COVID restrictions.
|-
|
|
|Re-admitted
|-
|Nick Ramsay
|
|
|Left the Conservative Group after being unhappy with the party's direction, and wanting to stand as an Independent in the Senedd election, after being deselected by the local group.
|-
|colspan=7|

2021–2026 Parliament
|-
|2022
| Rhys ab Owen
| 
|
|Suspended on 8 November 2022 pending an investigation by the Senedd's standards watchdog over an alleged breach of the code of conduct.
|-
|colspan=7|

Members of the Scottish Parliament who have changed party affiliation

Members of the Northern Ireland Assembly who have changed party affiliation

Police and crime commissioners (PCCs) who have changed party affiliation

References

Bibliography
 David Butler and Gareth Butler, Twentieth Century British Political Facts (Palgrave Macmillan, 2005)

Crossed
Crossed
British Members of Parliament who crossed the floor